INTECAP – Instituto Técnico de Capacitacion y Productividad is a university in Guatemala.

External links
Official site

Universities in Guatemala